Craig Harry Branney (born 31 July 1982 in Whitehaven, Cumbria) is a former motorcycle speedway rider from England.

Career
Branney rode with the Workington Comets in the Premier League in 2007. In July 2009, Craig joined the Stoke Potters. His final season was in 2010 with the Berwick Bandits.

Family
His brother John Branney also rode for the Workington Comets.

References 

1982 births
Living people
British speedway riders
English motorcycle racers
Sportspeople from Whitehaven
Oxford Cheetahs riders
Workington Comets riders
Hull Vikings riders